Heikkinen is the eighth most common Finnish surname. Notable people with the surname include:

 Aki Heikkinen (born 1980), Finnish decathlete
 Frans Heikkinen (1906–1943), Finnish cross country skier
 Henna Heikkinen (born 1988), Finnish singer from Idols Finland 2
 Ilkka Heikkinen (born 1984), Finnish ice hockey player
 Janne Heikkinen (volleyball) (born 1976), Finnish volleyball player
 Jussi Heikkinen (born 1988), Finnish football (soccer) player
 Kasperi Heikkinen (born 1980), guitar player, member of Amberian Dawn
 Leo Heikkinen (1917–1999), American businessman
 Markus Heikkinen (born 1978), Finnish footballer
 Matti Heikkinen (born 1983), Finnish cross country skier
 Mikko Heikkinen (born 1949), Finnish architect
 Ralph Heikkinen (1917–1990), American football player

References

See also
 Heikkinen – Komonen Architects (est. 1974), Finnish architectural firm

Finnish-language surnames
Patronymic surnames